Kazi Maruf (born 4 December 1983) is a Bangladeshi film actor. He has made his acting debut in the 2002 film Ithihas, produced and directed by his father Kazi Hayat. He was born in 1983 and received national award as the best actor in lead role for his work in 2002 , that make his age 18+ that means he is probably the youngest actor in the world to receive national award as best actor in the world. Kazi Maruf won the Bangladesh National Film Awards in his first movie named Ithihas which is written and directed by Kazi Hayat.

Family
Maruf is the son of Bangladeshi renowned film director and producer Kazi Hayat who introduced him in the Dhallywood film industry.

Kazi Maruf and his wife are currently living in New York, United States. Kazi Maruf also known as Kazi Rubaiat Hayat is the owner of FILM FACTORY INC. and is producing and acting in a film titled ( GREEN CARD ) which is the first Bengali film ever produced from an American film production company. Kazi Maruf (Kazi Rubaiat Hayat) has proved himself several times by his work and box office hits. From the year 2002 to 2015 he never compromised to be a part of any vulgar film. He was in a challenging era in dhallywood (dhaka film industry) at that time.His film ‘Captain Maruf’ was the first commercial film
Which was filmed with digital camera during the era of 35mm. ‘Captain Maruf’ was a supper hit and this film was based on the famous novel Man On fire written by A.J Quinnell. In Bangladesh film industry it’s a myth he needs no star opposite him,he worked with new actor/actress mostly in his films rather he makes such as Tama mirza in his movie Eve teasing, Yamin Bobby in Dehorokkhi (bodyguard).

Filmography

Music video

References

Living people
People from Dhaka
Bangladeshi male film actors
1983 births